The 2017 Men's International Festival of Hockey is the second edition of the annual International Festival of Hockey. The tournament will be held in Victoria, Australia. The tournament will take place between 5–12 November in the Victorian cities, Melbourne and Bendigo.

All times are local (UTC+10:00).

Participating nations

 (defending champions)

Results

Bendigo
The first stage of the tournament is two test matches in Bendigo at the Bendigo Hockey Complex.

Test matches

Melbourne
The second stage of the tournament is a 4 team competition at the State Netball and Hockey Centre in Melbourne.

Pool stage

Classification matches

Third and fourth place

Final

Statistics

Final standings

Goalscorers

7 Goals
 Blake Govers

4 Goals
 Aaron Kleinschmidt

2 Goals

 Kiran Arunasalam
 Jeremy Hayward
 Tom Wickham
 Kenta Tanaka
 Hirotaka Zendana
 George Muir

1 Goal

 Daniel Beale
 Joshua Pollard
 Jake Whetton
 Genki Mitani
 Marcus Child
 Jarred Panchia
 Hayden Phillips
 Muhammad Atiq
 Muhammad Umar Bhutta
 Ammad Shakeel Butt
 Abu Mhamood

References

International Festival of Hockey
International Festival
International Festival
2017 in New Zealand sport
2017 in Pakistani sport
2017 in Japanese sport
November 2017 sports events in Australia